Aulis is a masculine Finnish given name. The name means "helpful", "generous". Notable people with the name include:

Aulis Akonniemi, Finnish shot putter
Aulis Kallakorpi, Finnish ski jumper
Aulis Koponen, Finnish footballer
Aulis Rytkönen, Finnish football player and football manager
Aulis Sallinen, Finnish contemporary classical music composer

Finnish masculine given names